Jonas McPhail House and Annie McPhail Store includes two historic buildings located at Rosin, Sampson County, North Carolina.  The Jonas McPhail House, is a traditional, one-story, late 19th century farmhouse, with applied Late Victorian decorative elements.  The Annie McPhail Store is a two-story, frame, weatherboarded turn of the 20th century structure.  The buildings are adjacent to the separately listed Asher W. Bizzell House.

It was added to the National Register of Historic Places in 1986.

References

Houses on the National Register of Historic Places in North Carolina
Victorian architecture in North Carolina
Houses in Sampson County, North Carolina
National Register of Historic Places in Sampson County, North Carolina